C1-inhibitor (C1-inh, C1 esterase inhibitor) is a protease inhibitor belonging to the serpin superfamily. Its main function is the inhibition of the complement system to prevent spontaneous activation but also as the major regulator of the contact system. C1-inhibitor is an acute-phase protein that circulates in blood at levels of around 0.25 g/L. The levels rise ~2-fold during inflammation. C1-inhibitor irreversibly binds to and inactivates C1r and C1s proteases in the C1 complex of classical pathway of complement. MASP-1 and MASP-2 proteases in MBL complexes of the lectin pathway are also inactivated. This way, C1-inhibitor prevents the proteolytic cleavage of later complement components C4 and C2 by C1 and MBL. Although named after its complement inhibitory activity, C1-inhibitor also inhibits proteases of the fibrinolytic, clotting, and kinin pathways. Note that C1-inhibitor is the most important physiological inhibitor of plasma kallikrein, fXIa, and fXIIa.

Proteomics 

C1-inhibitor is the largest member among the serpin superfamily of proteins. It can be noted that, unlike most family members, C1-inhibitor has a 2-domain structure. The C-terminal serpin domain is similar to other serpins, which is the part of C1-inhibitor that provides the inhibitory activity. The N-terminal domain (also some times referred to as the N-terminal tail) is not essential for C1-inhibitor to inhibit proteases. This domain has no similarity to other proteins. C1-inhibitor is highly glycosylated, bearing both N- and O-glycans. N-terminal domain is especially heavily glycosylated.

Genetics 

The human C1-inhibitor gene (SERPING1) is located on the eleventh chromosome (11q11-q13.1).

Role in disease 

Deficiency of this protein is associated with hereditary angioedema ("hereditary angioneurotic edema"), or swelling due to leakage of fluid from blood vessels into connective tissue. Deficiency of C1-inhibitor permits plasma kallikrein activation, which leads to the production of the vasoactive peptide bradykinin. Also, C4 and C2 cleavage goes unchecked, resulting in auto-activation of the complement system. In its most common form, it presents as marked swelling of the face, mouth and/or airway that occurs spontaneously or to minimal triggers (such as mild trauma), but such swelling can occur in any part of the body. In 85% of the cases, the levels of C1-inhibitor are low, while in 15% the protein circulates in normal amounts but it is dysfunctional. In addition to the episodes of facial swelling and/or abdominal pain, it also predisposes to autoimmune diseases, most markedly lupus erythematosus, due to its consumptive effect on complement factors 3 and 4. Mutations in the gene that codes for C1-inhibitor, SERPING1, may also play a role in the development of age-related macular degeneration. At least 97 disease-causing mutations in this gene have been discovered. 

Despite uncontrolled auto-activation, it is important to note that levels of key complement components are low during an acute attack because they are being consumed - indeed, low levels of C4 are a key diagnostic test for hereditary angioedema. This situation is analogous to the low levels of clotting factors found in disseminated intravascular coagulation (DIC).

Medical use

Hereditary angioedema 

Blood-derived C1-inhibitor is effective but does carry the risk associated with the use of any human blood product. Cinryze, a pharmaceutical-grade C1-inhibitor, was approved for the use of HAE in 2008 in the US after having been available in Europe for decades. It is a highly purified, pasteurized and nanofiltered plasma-derived C1 esterase inhibitor product; it has been approved for routine prophylaxis against angioedema attacks in adolescent and adult patients with HAE.

A recombinant C1-inhibitor obtained from the milk of transgenic rabbits, conestat alfa (trade name Ruconest), is approved for the treatment of acute HAE attacks in adults.

While C1-inhibitor therapy has been used acutely for more than 35 years in Europe in patients with C1-inhibitor deficiency, new methods of treating acute attacks have emerged: a plasma kallikrein inhibitor and the bradykinin receptor antagonist icatibant.

Other products also have been introduced including plasma-derived products such as Berinert and Haegarda.

For other conditions 

The activation of the complement cascade can cause damage to cells, therefore the inhibition of the complement cascade can work as a medicine in certain conditions. When someone has a heart attack, for instance, the lack of oxygen in heart cells causes necrosis in heart cells: Dying heart cells spill their contents in the extracellular environment, which triggers the complement cascade. Activation of the complement cascade attracts phagocytes that leak peroxide and other reagents, which may increase the damage for the surviving heart cells. Inhibition of the complement cascade can decrease this damage.

Synthesis 

C1-inhibitor is contained in the human blood; it can, therefore, be isolated from donated blood. Risks of infectious disease transmission (viruses, prions, etc.) and relative expense of isolation prevented widespread use. It is also possible to produce it by recombinant technology, but Escherichia coli (the most commonly used organism for this purpose) lacks the eukaryotic ability to glycosylate proteins; as C1-inhibitor is particularly heavily glycosylated, this sialylated recombinant form would have a short circulatory life (the carbohydrates are not relevant to the inhibitor function). Therefore, C1-inhibitor has also been produced in glycosylated form using transgenic rabbits. This form of recombinant C1-inhibitor also has been given orphan drug status for delayed graft function following organ transplantation and for capillary leakage syndrome.

References

Further reading

External links 
 
 
 The MEROPS online database for peptidases and their inhibitors: I04.024
 
 

Complement system
Serine protease inhibitors
Takeda Pharmaceutical Company brands